Fat Chance is a 1994 young adult novel written by Lesléa Newman. The book centers on a 13-year-old girl named Judi Liebowitz, who goes on a bulimic diet to try to lose weight. The novel was published by Putnam Press in 1994–2004 and by Scholastic from 2004–present.

Plot summary 
Judi Liebowitz wants to lose weight, be the thinnest girl in eighth grade, and have a boyfriend. She's convinced that if only she had "creamy thighs and amazing cheekbones that look like I'm always sipping through a straw" her best friend Monica wouldn't have stolen the boy she had a crush on. When Judi meets glamorous, thin as a stick (tiny as) Nancy Pratt, she thinks her life will turn around and she'll be gorgeous. Nancy teaches Judi the secret she uses to staying thin, binge-purge thinking this will somehow help. Judi is thrilled she can "have her cake and eat it, too and she won't gain weight." But then, something dreadful happens to Nancy Pratt because of her eating disorder and she ends up in intensive care. Judi really doesn't want the same thing to happen to her but she just can't control her disorder and the worst part is, she can't or doesn't want to tell anyone, not even her own mother. This is no easy thing to cure and it's no joke for Nancy or Judi, it's a matter of Life or Death.

Reception 
Fat Chance was awarded the Parents' Choice Silver Medal in 1994. It was also a Finalist for the Iowa Teen Award in 1997.

Reviews 
Critical reviews for Fat Chance were positive. Publishers Weekly starred its review, stating that "Judi's convincing voice and true-to-life experiences add up to a compelling, thought-provoking narrative...This book should be required reading for adolescent girls." The Los Angeles Times hailed the book, calling it, "A fabulous book which I recommend without reservation to people of any age who have asked themselves, 'Why did I eat that?'" Booklist said, "What Newman really gets right is the voice....the angst and the details are perfect."

References

External links 

Fat Chance at Scholastic

1994 American novels
American young adult novels
Novels about eating disorders